LaGrange Highlands School District 106 is an elementary school district based in La Grange Highlands, an outlying suburb of Chicago located in Cook County, Illinois, near the border with DuPage County. District 106 is composed of two schools: one elementary school and one middle school, each named for the district. The school has 992 students enrolled, and serves 976 of those students currently. The district elementary school, Highlands Elementary School, serves students ranging from prekindergarten to grade four under direction of principal Laura Magruder. District students in grades five through eight move to Highlands Middle School, which is headed by principal Megan VerVynck and assistant principal Stetson Steele. John Munch serves as the superintendent of the district. Highlands feeds into Lyons Township Highschool.

Activities and Extracurriculars

Clubs and Activities 
Highlands Elementary School is home to multiple clubs, mostly in 3rd and 4th grade, including STEM, Art, and Computer clubs. Highlands Middle School is home to a many multitude of clubs, ranging from a What's The Buzz, a club that produces the school newspaper; to clubs specializing in art, science, and chess, as well as an intramural sports club for students in 5th and 6th that allows them to play sports with each other before moving up to official school teams. There is also a school garden, run by the garden club, and a recycling club that handles the recycling. Students may also join band, orchestra, or choir starting in 4th grade until their 8th grade year, with no requirements, though they may choose to try out for jazz band, chamber orchestra, or show choir respectively.

Sports 
Highlands Middle School is home to all major sports in the area, and they compete with surrounding middle schools such as Park, McClure, Gurrie, etc. Starting in 5th grade, students can participate in Cross Country, with no try out necessary. Highlands has a very large cross country team with approximately 100 members in the 2022 season, most likely because 5th and 6th graders can't play most competitive sports yet and it is highly encouraged.  Highlands also, with separate teams for both 7th and 8th grade, has a boys and girls basketball team, volleyball team, and softball team. They also have one co-ed soccer team. All of these sports being cut sports, though for some everyone who tries out will make the team due to lack of players.

Demographics 
Highlands has 994 students enrolled with 980 of those students being officially served in homerooms. Pre-K is smaller than all the other grades, with only 47 students in the 2022-23 school year, though it picks up to around 100 for all grades after, with 6th grade being the most with 115, and Kindergarten least with 91.  A total of 504 boys and 472 girls are enrolled in the district. In recent years Highlands has been experiencing a population boom due to new homes in the area, with a roughly 22% increase in enrollment in the past 7 years.  The largest racial group out of students in the district is white with 78.1%, followed by Hispanic with 12.3%, multi-racial with 4.3%, Asian with 4%, and African-American with 1.2%.  About 12% of students have IEPs, 4% are English learners, and 2% are qualified for free or reduced lunches. About 4.3% of students in the district are considered low-income, and 0.1% are homeless.

References

External links

School districts in Cook County, Illinois